Leopold Ritter von Sacher-Masoch (27 January 1836 – 9 March 1895) was an Austrian nobleman, writer and journalist, who gained renown for his romantic stories of Galician life. The term masochism is derived from his name, invented by his contemporary, the Austrian psychiatrist Richard von Krafft-Ebing. Masoch did not approve of this use of his name.

During his lifetime, Sacher-Masoch was well known as a man of letters, in particular a utopian thinker who espoused socialist and humanist ideals in his fiction and non-fiction. Most of his works remain untranslated into English.

Biography

Early life and education
Von Sacher-Masoch was born in the city of Lemberg, the capital of the Kingdom of Galicia and Lodomeria, at the time a province of the Austrian Empire, into the Roman Catholic family of an Austrian civil servant, Leopold Johann Nepomuk Ritter von Sacher (1797–1874), and Charlotte Josepha von Masoch (1802–1870), a Ukrainian noblewoman. The father later combined his surname with his wife's von Masoch, at the request of her family (she was the last of the line). Von Sacher served as a Commissioner of the Imperial Police Forces in Lemberg, and he was recognised with a new title of nobility as Sacher-Masoch awarded by the Austrian Emperor.

Leopold studied law, history and mathematics at Graz University (where he obtained a doctorate in history in 1856), and after graduating he became a lecturer there.

Galician storyteller

His early, non-fictional publications dealt mostly with Austrian history. At the same time, Masoch turned to the folklore and culture of his homeland, Galicia. Soon he abandoned lecturing and became a free man of letters. Within a decade his short stories and novels prevailed over his historical non-fiction works, though historical themes continued to imbue his fiction.

Panslavist ideas were prevalent in Masoch's literary work, and he found a particular interest in depicting picturesque types among the various ethnicities that inhabited Galicia. From the 1860s to the 1880s he published a number of volumes of Jewish Short Stories, Polish Short Stories, Galician Short Stories, German Court Stories and Russian Court Stories.

The Legacy of Cain
In 1869, Sacher-Masoch conceived a grandiose series of short stories under the collective title Legacy of Cain that would represent the author's aesthetic Weltanschauung. The cycle opened with the manifesto The Wanderer that brought out misogynist themes that became peculiar to Masoch's writings. Of the six planned volumes, only the first two were ever completed. By the middle of the 1880s, Masoch abandoned the Legacy of Cain. Nevertheless, the published volumes of the series included Masoch's best-known stories, and of them, Venus in Furs (published 1870) is the most famous today. The novella expressed Sacher-Masoch's fantasies and fetishes (especially for dominant women wearing fur). He did his best to live out his fantasies with his mistresses and wives. In 1873 he married Angelika Aurora von Rümelin.

Philosemitism

Sacher-Masoch edited the Leipzig-based monthly literary magazine Auf der Höhe. Internationale Review (At the pinnacle. International review), which was published from October 1881 to September 1885.

In his later years, he worked against local antisemitism through an association for adult education called the Oberhessischer Verein für Volksbildung (OVV), founded in 1893 with his second wife, Hulda Meister, who had also been his assistant for some years.

Private life and inspiration for Venus in Furs

Fanny Pistor was an emerging literary writer. She met Sacher-Masoch after she contacted him, under the assumed name and fictitious title of Baroness Bogdanoff, for suggestions on improving her writing to make it suitable for publication. She was the inspiration for Venus im Pelz.

Later years
In 1874, Masoch wrote the novel Die Ideale unserer Zeit (The Ideals of Our Time), an attempt to give a portrait of German society during its Gründerzeit period.

In his late fifties, his mental health began to deteriorate, and he spent the last years of his life under psychiatric care. According to official reports, he died in Lindheim near Altenstadt, in 1895. It is also claimed that he died in an asylum in Mannheim in 1905.

Sacher-Masoch is the great-uncle of Eva von Sacher-Masoch, Baroness Erisso, mother of British singer and actress Marianne Faithfull.

Masochism
The term masochism was coined in 1886 by the Austrian psychiatrist Richard Freiherr von Krafft-Ebing (1840–1902) in his book Psychopathia Sexualis:

Sacher-Masoch was not pleased with Krafft-Ebing's assertions. Nevertheless, details of Masoch's private life were obscure until Aurora von Rümelin's memoirs, Meine Lebensbeichte (My Life Confession; 1906), were published in Berlin under the pseudonym Wanda v. Dunajew (the name of a leading character in his Venus in Furs). The following year, a French translation, Confession de ma vie (1907) by "Wanda von Sacher-Masoch", was printed in Paris by Mercure de France. An English translation of the French edition was published as The Confessions of Wanda von Sacher-Masoch (1991) by RE/Search Publications.

Selected bibliography

 1858 A Galician Story 1846
 1865 Kaunitz
 1866 Don Juan of Kolomiya
 1867 The Last King of Hungary
 1870 The Divorcee
 1870 Legacy of Cain. Vol. 1: Love (includes his most famous work Venus in Furs)
 1872 Faux Ermine
 1873 Female Sultan
 1873 The Messalinas of Vienna
 1873–74 Russian Court Stories: 4 Vols.
 1873–77 Viennese Court Stories: 2 Vols.
 1874/76  [Love Stories from Several Centuries], 3 volumes, includes "" ("Bloody Wedding in Kyiv"), "Ariella"
 1874 Die Ideale unserer Zeit [The Ideals of Our Time]
 1875 Galician Stories
 1877 The Man Without Prejudice
 1877 Legacy of Cain. Vol. 2: Property
 1878 The New Hiob
 1878 Jewish Stories
 1878 The Republic of Women's Enemies
 1879 Silhouettes
 1881 New Jewish Stories
 1883  (The Mother of God)
 1886 Eternal Youth
 1886 Stories from Polish Ghetto
 1886 Little Mysteries of World History
 1886 Bloody Wedding in Kyiv'
 1887 Polish Stories 1890 The Serpent in Paradise 1891 The Lonesome 1894 Love Stories 1898 Entre nous 1900 Catherina II 1901 Afrikas Semiramis 1907 Fierce WomenSee also
 BDSM
 Marquis de Sade
 Sadism and masochism in fiction
 Story of ONotes

Further reading
 Bach, Ulrich E, "Sacher-Masoch's Utopian Peripheries." In: The German Quarterly 80.2 (2007): 201–219.
 Biale, David, "Masochism and Philosemitism: The Strange Case of Leopold Von Sacher-Masoch", Journal of Contemporary History 17 (1982), 305–323.
Deleuze, Gilles, "Coldness and Cruelty," in Masochism, New York: Zone Books (1991).
 John K. Noyes, The Mastery of Submission. Inventions of Masochism. Ithaca: Cornell University Press 1997.
 Carlo Di Mascio, Masoch sovversivo. Cinque studi su Venus im Pelz, Firenze, Phasar Edizioni, 2018. 
 Alison Moore, Recovering Difference in the Deleuzian Dichotomy of Masochism-without-Sadism. Angelaki 14 (3), November 2009, 27–43.
 Alison M. Moore, Sexual Myths of Modernity: Sadism, Masochism and Historical Teleology. Lanham: Lexington Books, 2016. 

External links

 
 
 Venus in Furs from Project Gutenberg
 The Bookbinder of Hort, part of an anthology, Stories by Foreign Authors''
 
 
 The Letawitza
 The Independent Saturday, 23 July 1994 
 Stanislav Tsalyk: Don Juan of Lviv

1836 births
1895 deaths
Writers from Lviv
19th-century Austrian writers
19th-century Austrian novelists
Austro-Hungarian writers
Austrian journalists
Austrian male writers
Austrian socialists
German-language writers
Austrian erotica writers
BDSM writers
Austrian male novelists
19th-century male writers